Julie Chávez Rodriguez (born 1979)  is an American political rights activist and the director of the White House Office of Intergovernmental Affairs. She grew up in California in a well-known family of American labor and civil rights activists, the granddaughter of American labor leader, César Chávez and American labor activist Helen Fabela Chávez. From 2008 to 2016, Rodriguez served in the Obama administration, initially working for the United States Secretary of the Interior and later in the White House Office of Public Engagement. 

She was appointed state director for Senator Kamala Harris in 2016. She later served on the Kamala Harris 2020 presidential campaign from 2017 to 2019. In 2020, Rodriguez was hired by the Joe Biden 2020 presidential campaign as senior advisor for Latino outreach. Rodriguez was appointed to be the director of the White House Office of Intergovernmental Affairs by President Joe Biden, and took office on January 20, 2021.

On June 15, 2022 ahead of the 2022 midterm elections President Biden promoted her to be a senior advisor to the president, a senior staff position. She will continue to serve as director of the White House Office of Intergovernmental Affairs.

Early life and education
Rodriguez was born in Delano, California. She was raised in Tehachapi in a family of well-known labor activists affiliated with the United Farm Workers of America organization. She is the daughter of Linda Chávez Rodriguez and Arturo Rodriguez, and the granddaughter of American labor activist, Helen Fabela Chávez, and American labor leader, César Chávez. Her parents were full time volunteers for the UFWA. Rodriguez would often attend labor rallies with her parents and grandparents and assist them in UFWA community outreach activities. Rodriguez attended Tehachapi High School, and later attended the University of California, Berkeley, where earned a Bachelor of Science degree in Latin American Studies.
During her summer breaks, Rodriguez worked at the AFL–CIO. She also spent summers volunteering with the UFWA, organizing strawberry pickers in Watsonville, California.

Career
From 2001 to 2008, Rodriguez worked as a program director at the Cesar Chavez Foundation. She worked as a full-time volunteer for the 2008 presidential campaign of Barack Obama in Colorado. In 2009, Rodriguez was hired by the Obama administration, initially working as Director of Youth Employment and later as Deputy Press Secretary to former United States Secretary of the Interior, Ken Salazar. From 2011 to 2017, Rodriguez served at the White House Office of Public Engagement as deputy director of public engagement and later served as Special Assistant to President Obama. Her work as deputy director initially involved immigration and Latino outreach, and evolved over time into the management of the White House's outreach program to Latino, LGBT, veteran, Asian American and Pacific Islander, Muslim, youth, education and progressive communities.

On December 11, 2016, Rodríguez was appointed by California Senator Kamala Harris to serve as her state director. In 2017, Rodriguez was hired by the Kamala Harris 2020 presidential campaign and served on the campaign until Harris withdrew her candidacy in late-2019. Rodriguez initially served as co-national political director and later took on the role of the campaign's traveling chief of staff. In 2020, Rodriquez was hired by the Joe Biden 2020 presidential campaign as senior advisor to oversee Latino outreach. She is the highest-ranking Latina working for the campaign.

Rodriguez was appointed to be the director of the White House Office of Intergovernmental Affairs by President Joe Biden, and took office on January 20, 2021.

See also
Cesar Chavez
Sí se puede

References

External links

1979 births
Activists for Hispanic and Latino American civil rights
AFL–CIO people
American trade unionists of Mexican descent
American women trade unionists
American politicians of Mexican descent
Biden administration personnel
California Democrats
Cesar Chavez
Living people
Obama administration personnel
People from Kern County, California
Trade unionists from California
United Farm Workers people
United States Department of the Interior officials
University of California, Berkeley alumni